Colette is a surname. Notable people with the surname include:

  (born 1937), French actress
 Claude Colette (1929–1990), French professional racing cyclist
  (1920–2003), French swimmer
  (died 2021), Ivorian woman in business
  (born 1929), Belgian philosopher
 Sidonie-Gabrielle Colette (1873–1954), French novelist
 Sheena Colette (born?) American actress
 Théo Colette (born 1927), Belgian footballer

See also 

 Colette (disambiguation)
 Coletta (surname)
 Collette (surname)